Ślęza Wrocław is a Polish professional women's basketball club that was founded in 1953 in the city of Wrocław. Ślęza Wrocław plays in the Energa Basket Liga Kobiet, the highest competition in Poland. In the 2017-18 season the team is also playing in EuroCup Women.

Titles
 Polish Championship:
 1st place (2): 1987, 2017
 2nd place (4): 1982, 1984, 1985, 1986
 3nd place (4): 1993, 2001, 2002, 2016

Current roster

References

External links
 Official Website

Women's basketball teams in Poland
Sport in Wrocław
Basketball teams established in 1953